The 2014 season is the 102nd season of competitive soccer in the United States.

National teams

Men

Senior

Goalscorers

Under-23

Under-20

Under-18

Under-17

Women

Senior

Under-23

Under-20

American club leagues

Major League Soccer

Conference tables 
 Eastern Conference

 Western Conference

Overall table 
Note: the table below has no impact on playoff qualification and is used solely for determining host of the MLS Cup, certain CCL spots, the Supporters' Shield trophy, seeding in the 2014 Canadian Championship, and 2014 MLS draft. The conference tables are the sole determinant for teams qualifying for the playoffs.

North American Soccer League

Spring Season

Fall Season

USL Pro

Overall table

National Women's Soccer League

Overall table

US Open Cup

Honors

Professional

Amateur

American clubs in international competition

2013–14 CONCACAF Champions League

LA Galaxy

Sporting Kansas City

San Jose Earthquakes

References

 
Seasons in American soccer